Senseneb (also Seniseneb) was the mother of Pharaoh Thutmose I of the early New Kingdom. She only bore the title of King's mother (Mw.t-nswt) and is therefore thought to have been a commoner. Senseneb is known thanks to stele Cairo CG 34006, from Wadi Halfa, where she is shown swearing an oath of allegiance as the king's mother on the coronation of her son Thutmose I. Senseneb is also depicted on painted reliefs from the Mortuary Temple of Hatshepsut at Deir el-Bahri.

References

16th-century BC women
Queens consort of the Eighteenth Dynasty of Egypt